Joseph Power (5 October 1798 – 1868) was the librarian of the University of Cambridge from 1845 to 1864.

References 

1798 births
1868 deaths
Cambridge University Librarians
People from Market Bosworth
Fellows of Trinity Hall, Cambridge
19th-century English clergy
English mathematicians
English librarians